Andrew Pitt (born 19 February 1976 in Kempsey, New South Wales, Australia) is a retired motorcycle racer. He is a double World Supersport Champion, and has also won a World Superbike race and competed in MotoGP. He lives in Peel on the Isle of Man.

Career

Early career
Pitt began racing in the NSW State 250 Production Series in 1995, winning it in 1997. He was Australian Supersport Champion and Superbike runner-up in 1999, before entering the Supersport World Championship in 2000 riding for Kawasaki. He finished 10th in his debut season and won the title in 2001, without winning a race. For 2002 he continued in Supersport with Kawasaki finishing the season 5th and gaining his first two victories.

MotoGP & Superbike World Championship
At the end of 2002 he was given a ride on Kawasaki's first MotoGP bike for the final 3 races of the season. He took his and Kawasaki's first MotoGP points at the final race of the season. His promising results in 2002 made Kawasaki offer him a full-time MotoGP ride for the 2003 season. He matched experienced teammate Garry McCoy, but neither was retained after an uncompetitive year. He made occasional appearances for Moriwaki in 2004 as part of their development programme.

In 2004 Yamaha signed him. He finished the season 8th overall, behind teammate Noriyuki Haga who was third. At the end of the  season, he lost his seat to fellow Australian and  Superbike World Champion Troy Corser.

For 2007, he signed to race in MotoGP for the Ilmor team. He was forced to retire with mechanical problems from the first race of the season in Qatar. On 15 March 2007, Ilmor announced that they were taking a break from MotoGP as a result of funding issues. This left Pitt without a ride.

Return to Supersport
Later in 2007 he made two substitute appearances in the Supersport World Championship for Ten Kate replacing the injured Sébastien Charpentier, taking two second places behind dominant teammate Kenan Sofuoğlu.

In 2008 he races in World Supersport for Ten Kate full-time, replacing Sofuoglu. In his first race he collided with the crashed bike of teammate Jonathan Rea. He won three of the first six races to establish a championship lead. A collision with Eugene Laverty at Vallelunga threatened to derail his championship challenge, but he clinched the 2008 World Supersport championship in the penultimate round at Magny-Cours after closest rival Rea was taken out by Robbin Harms. During the Brands Hatch race in 2008, Pitt was involved in an accident that claimed the life of Craig Jones. The British rider fell in front of Pitt at Clark Curve, and Pitt's bike unavoidably struck the head of Jones, who died from his injuries on 4 August.

He remained with the team for 2009, despite originally targeting a return to WSBK. He opened the season with two second places on the 2008 bike, but struggled once the 2009 model was introduced. He was replaced by Michele Pirro for 2010.

Return to Superbike
On 16 December 2009, it was announced that Pitt had agreed a contract with the Reitwagen Motorsport team to ride in the 2010 Superbike World Championship season. Pitt partnered teammate Roland Resch in riding a satellite version of the BMW S1000RR. However, the team pulled out after only three races due to a lack of funds.

British Superbike Championship
Pitt again changed direction following the demise of Reitwagen, joining Rob McElnea's team midway through the 2010 British Superbike Championship season as a replacement for Neil Hodgson, but he was injured in a crash at Brands Hatch and missed the rest of the season.

Retirement
In June 2011 Pitt, who was still recovering, became Gary Mason's crew chief at MSS Colchester Kawasaki in British Superbike Championship.

In January 2012, Pitt, having struggled with the shoulder injury suffered in 2010, announced his retirement from motorcycle racing.

Career statistics

All-time statistics

Supersport World Championship

Races by year
(key) (Races in bold indicate pole position) (Races in italics indicate fastest lap)

Grand Prix motorcycle racing

Races by year
(key) (Races in bold indicate pole position, races in italics indicate fastest lap)

Superbike World Championship

Races by year
(key) (Races in bold indicate pole position) (Races in italics indicate fastest lap)

British Superbike Championship

Races by year
(key) (Races in bold indicate pole position) (Races in italics indicate fastest lap)

References

External links

 andrewpitt.com Official website

1976 births
People from New South Wales
Australian motorcycle racers
Kawasaki Motors Racing MotoGP riders
Superbike World Championship riders
Supersport World Championship riders
Living people
British Superbike Championship riders
MotoGP World Championship riders